is a Japanese fashion model. In the past she belonged to the agency Starray Production, and is currently a free agent. She is mainly known as featuring in the magazine Happie Nuts.

Biography
While working as an employee of Shibuya 109's "Lip Service", she became an exclusive model of the magazine Happie Nuts. Her first solo cover in the magazine was the April issue of 2010. In 2012, she took part in the fashion show Tokyo Girls Collection.

Together with models Kozue Akimoto and Misaki Izuoka in 2013, she joined the fashion brand "Sly Lang".

In 2014, her Happie Nuts career ended with the discontinuation of the magazine.

Private life
Ozaki grew up in Nagoya and at sixteen years old moved to Tokyo to her second year high school. Later she attended university in parallel to her modelling career.

Television appearances

References

External links 

 Official profile 
 Official blog 

Japanese female models
Models from Aichi Prefecture
1989 births
Living people